USS or USNS Pathfinder may refer to:

  which shows in some photographs as USS Pathfinder and in early years had Navy personnel among the crew.
 , launched 1942; in U.S. Navy service from 1942–1946; also known as USC&GS Pathfinder
 , launched 1992 and currently in active service

United States Navy ship names